The 1963 Hong Kong Urban Council election was held on 7 March 1963 for the four of the eight elected seats of the Urban Council of Hong Kong. Elsie Elliott, educator and social activist was first elected to the council on the Reform Club ticket, while lawyer Cheung Wing-in became the new elected member for the Hong Kong Civic Association.

Overview
The polling stations increased to four in this year. City Hall in Central, headquarter of the Hong Kong Volunteer Defence Corps in Happy Valley, East wing of the Star Ferry Pier in South Kowloon and North Kowloon Magistracy in North Kowloon. 5,320 of the 25,932 eligible electorates came out and voted which was about 20.5 per cent.

The Civic–Reform Coalition continued and the seats were divided by these two groups. Elsie Elliott was elected to the council for the first time representing the Reform Club and also backed by the Civic Association, succeeding Dr. Alison Bell. The other Club candidate Dr. Raymond Harry Shoon Lee was re-elected and the last seat went to Cheung Wing-in from the Association who replaced Ernest Charles Wong.

Chan Shu-woon, a former Reform Club member quit the Club in 1963 ran as an Independent in the election. Brook Bernacchi, leader of the Reform Club later on sued Chan for alleged corruption during the election campaign. Chan subsequently resigned from the office in 1964 and departed Hong Kong for the United States.

Results

By-election
There was a by-election took place in 1964 for the vacant seat of Chan Shu-woon.

Napoleon Ng representing Civic–Reform Union ran against Independent Solomon Rafeek and got defeated. The Reform Club accused some members of the Civic Association had used their influential to back up Rafeek who was already a member of that Association. The Club found this unacceptable within the terms of the Coalition, and became one of the reasons for the Union being dissolved. Rafeek formally joined the Civic Association in April.

Citations

References
 Lau, Y.W. (2002). A history of the municipal councils of Hong Kong : 1883-1999 : from the Sanitary Board to the Urban Council and the Regional Council. Leisure and Cultural Service Dept. 
 Pepper, Suzanne (2008). Keeping Democracy at Bay:Hong Kong and the Challenge of Chinese Political Reform. Rowman & Littlefield.

Hong Kong
1963 in Hong Kong
Urban
March 1963 events in Asia
1963 elections in the British Empire